The Duskfall is a Swedish melodic death metal band from Luleå, formed in 1999. The band released four full-length studio albums and, shortly afterwards, split in 2008; however, they reformed in 2014.

History
The band was formed in 1999 when guitarist Mikael Sandorf, split-up from his previous melodic death metal band Gates of Ishtar and shortly afterwards the band was created. Initially the band would be named Soulash, until changing it in 2001 to The Duskfall. Although line-up changes would hamper the band at first when band members Tommi Konu and Urban Carlsson departed, they would quickly fill the vacant slots with drummer Oskar Karlsson (from the later period of Gates of Ishtar) and bassist Kaj Molin. Soon after, the band would record and release their first demo entitled Deliverance in 2001.

In 2002, Duskfall released their debut album Frailty, which was produced by Daniel Bergstrand. After the release of Frailty, Joachim Lindbäck would join the band on guitar. The final product was 2003's Source  which was recorded at Daniel Bergstrand's Dug Out Studios. Duskfall would suffer more departures in the form of members Joachim Lindbäck and Kaj Molin. Eventually the band would recruit Antti Lindholm (also the vocalist and guitarist in Finnish hard rock trio Lambs) on guitars and Marco Eronen on bass. With the new additions, Duskfall would focus on recording their third studio album, Lifetime Supply of Guilt.

The Duskfall released their fourth album The Dying Wonders of the World on October 26, 2007.

A statement on the official website, dated August 4, 2008, confirmed that the band had disbanded following the departure of main songwriter and founder Mikael Sandorf.

In 2014, Mikael Sandorf announced the band was back together via social media (Facebook and Twitter) and would be recording for the band's fifth album. The album, titled Where The Tree Stands Dead, was produced by Ahti Kortelainen (Sonata Arctica, Moonsorrow, Sentenced).

Later, The Duskfall announced at the Facebook page that Aki Häkkinen, the frontman of the Finnish nu-metal band Grinister, replaced Klavborn on vocals. They also announced bassist Jonatan Storm's departure, with Anton Lindbäck replacing Storm.

During December 2016, The Duskfall confirmed their new lead guitarist Jakob Björnfot (replacing Ronny Edlund) and during mid 2017 they announced Aki Häkkinen's departure. In 2017, Edlund rejoined the band.  The band's new album The Everlasting Shadows was set to come out in 2019 via Black Lion Records.

Members
Current Members
 Mikael Sandorf – drums (1999-2001), lead guitar (2001-2008, 2014-2017), vocals (2001, 2017-present)
 Ronny Edlund - rhythm guitar (2014-2016, 2017-present)
 Anton Lindbäck - bass (2015-present)
 Patrik Forlund – lead guitar(2019-present)
 Sebastian Lindgren - drums (2016-present)

Former Members
 Pär Johansson - vocals (1999-2000)
 Kai Jaakkola - vocals (2001-2008)
 Magnus Klavborn - vocals (2014-2015)
 Aki Häkkinen - vocals (2015-2017)
 Antti Lindholm - rhythm guitar (2004-2008), bass (2005)
 Jonny Ahlgren - rhythm guitar (1999-2001)
 Jakob Björnfot – lead guitar(2017-2019)
 Glenn Svensson - lead guitar (1999-2002)
 Joachim Lindbäck - lead guitar (2003-2004)
 Tommi Konu - bass (1999-2001)
 Kaj Molin - bass (2001-2005)
 Matte Järnil - bass (2006-2008)
 Kim Bjäle - bass (2014)
 Jonatan Storm - bass, vocals (2014-2015)
 Urban Carlsson - drums (2001)
 Oskar Karlsson - drums (2001-2008)
 Fredrik Andersson - drums (2014-2016)

Timeline

Discography

In popular media
The video for the song "Shoot It In" is featured in the video game The Darkness.
The song "Case Closed" is featured in the film Five Across the Eyes.

References

External links
 Official Facebook

Swedish melodic death metal musical groups
Musical groups established in 1999
Musical groups disestablished in 2008
Musical quintets
Nuclear Blast artists
1999 establishments in Sweden